Rathri Mazha (ml; രാത്രി മഴ) was an Indian Malayalam-language soap opera which was launched by Flowers TV on 19 September 2016. It aired on weekdays at 9:30 P.M IST. It is an adaptation of Mayadevi's novel with the same title published in Manorama Weekly. Actress Sreekala Sasidharan played the lead role in the series.

Cast

Main
 Sreekala Sasidharan as Archana / Alice / Suja
 Niranjan Nayar as Sudheesh (Sudhi)
 Parvathy R Krishna as Niranjana

Recurring
 Thomas Kuriakose as S.P Vishwanathan
 Uma Nair as Jayanthi Vishwanathan
 Nila Menon as Bhagyam
 Sreekala as Shyamala
 Jayan Amboori as Rajappan
 Parvathy Nair as Ambili
 T.N. Krishna as Nadarajan
 Thanvi S Raveendran as Revathy 
 Ambarish as Dineshan
 Ranjith Raj as Saji
 Krishna as Rajappan
 Kottayam Manju as Geetha
 Manu Poojappura as Shabari
 Sini Prasad as Karthyayani  Kallu Karthyayani 
 Shobi Thilikan as Raghavan  Chevala Raghavan 
 Prakash SP as Faizy
 Dhanya Chandralekha as Snehalatha
 Parvathy Krishnakumar as Dr Hima
 Vinod as CI Surendran
 Lakshmi as Saji's mother
 Rajendran as Commissioner
 Anil as James
 Bindu Menon as Bhamini
 RV Sneha as Mollykutty
 Aakash Menon as Anirudh
 Jayan as Ambrose
 Maya Suresh as Thenmala Rosy
 Santhosh as Ashokan
 Rahul as Vishnu
 Anirudh Rajsekhar

Awards
Kerala State Television Awards
Special Jurie Prize -Nila Menon
Kerala Vision Television Awards
Best Performance -Nila Menon
Mangalam Television Awards 2017
Best Serial
Best Director - Baiju Devraj
Best Associate Director -Raju Nair
Special Jury prize -Nila Menon

References 

2016 Indian television series debuts
Malayalam-language television shows
Flowers (TV channel) original programming